Cleverdon is a surname. Notable people with the surname include: 

Cyril Cleverdon (1914–1997), British librarian and computer scientist 
Douglas Cleverdon (1903–1987), English radio producer and bookseller
Harold Cleverdon (1904–1994), Canadian Anglican priest
Julia Cleverdon (born 1950), British charity worker
Scott Cleverdon (born 1969), Scottish actor